The first season of the American television drama series The Americans premiered on January 30, 2013, and concluded on May 1, 2013. It consisted of 13 episodes, each running for approximately 45 minutes, except for a pilot of over an hour. FX broadcast the first season on Wednesdays at 10:00 pm in the United States. The series is produced by DreamWorks Television. The Americans was created by Joe Weisberg.

Set in the 1980s during the Cold War period, The Americans is the story of Elizabeth (Keri Russell) and Philip Jennings (Matthew Rhys), two Soviet KGB officers posing as an American married couple in the suburbs of Washington, D.C., their two children, and their neighbor, Stan Beeman (Noah Emmerich), an FBI agent.

Cast

Main
 Keri Russell as Elizabeth Jennings (Nadezhda), a KGB officer
 Matthew Rhys as Philip Jennings (Mischa), a KGB officer
 Maximiliano Hernández as FBI Agent Chris Amador
 Holly Taylor as Paige Jennings, Elizabeth and Philip's daughter
 Keidrich Sellati as Henry Jennings, Elizabeth and Philip's son
 Noah Emmerich as FBI Agent Stan Beeman

Recurring
 Richard Thomas as Agent Frank Gaad, Special Agent In Charge of the FBI Counterintelligence Division
 Annet Mahendru as Nina Sergeevna, Agent Beeman's Soviet mole
 Margo Martindale as Claudia, the Jennings' KGB supervisor
 Susan Misner as Sandra Beeman, Stan's wife
 Alison Wright as Martha Hanson, Agent Gaad's secretary and Philip's informant
 Lev Gorn as Arkady Ivanovich, the KGB's second Rezident
 Daniel Flaherty as Matthew Beeman, Stan's son
 Peter Von Berg as Vasili Nikolaevich, the KGB's original Rezident
 Derek Luke as Gregory Thomas, Elizabeth's KGB recruit
 Reg Rogers as Charles Duluth, a journalist and KGB source
 Gillian Alexy as Annelise, an informant of Philip's

Production

Conception
The Americans was created by Joe Weisberg, a former CIA officer. Despite its spy setting, Weisberg set out to tell the story about a marriage. "The Americans is at its core a marriage story. International relations is just an allegory for the human relations. Sometimes, when you're struggling in your marriage or with your kid, it feels like life or death. For Philip and Elizabeth, it often is." Executive producer Joel Fields described the series as working different levels of reality: the fictional world of the marriage between Philip and Elizabeth, and the real world involving the characters' experiences during the Cold War.

Working at the CIA, which Weisberg later described as a mistake, has helped him develop several storylines in the series, basing some plot lines on real-life stories, and integrating several things he learned in his training, such as dead drops and communication protocols. Weisberg was fascinated by stories he had heard from agents who served abroad as spies, while raising their families. He was interested in bringing that concept to television, with the idea of a family of spies, rather than just one person. Weisberg also said how the CIA inadvertently gave him the idea for creating a series around spies, explaining, "While I was taking the polygraph exam to get in, they asked the question, 'Are you joining the CIA in order to gain experience about the intelligence community so that you can write about it later – which had never occurred to me. I was totally joining the CIA because I wanted to be a spy. But the second they asked that question…then I thought, 'Now I'm going to fail the test.'"

Weisberg was partially influenced by the events of the Illegals Program to write a pilot script for the series. His research material included notes on the KGB's Cold War left by Vasili Mitrokhin and conversations with some of his former colleagues at the CIA. He stated that, unlike the circumstances involving the 2010 Russian spy ring, he had opted to set the story in the early 1980s because "a modern day [setting] didn't seem like a good idea", adding, "People were both shocked and simultaneously shrugged at the [2010] scandal because it didn't seem like we were really enemies with Russia anymore. An obvious way to remedy that for television was to stick it back in the Cold War. At first, the '70s appealed to me just because I loved the hair and the music. But can you think of a better time than the '80s with Ronald Reagan yelling about the evil empire?"

Development
After reading Weisberg's novel, An Ordinary Spy, executive producer Graham Yost discovered that Weisberg had also written a pilot for a possible spy series. Yost read the pilot and discovered that it was "annoyingly good", which led to the beginning of motions to develop the show. Shooting of the pilot began in May 2012 and lasted until mid-June. Filming began for the rest of the first season in November 2012 in the New York City area. The production used location shots to simulate a dramatic setting of Washington, D.C. Early filming was delayed by flooding caused by Hurricane Sandy.

Casting
Weisberg stated that he had no idea about who would star in the series before casting began. FX president John Landgraf had the idea to cast Keri Russell in the series. Leslie Feldman, who is the head of casting at DreamWorks, saw Matthew Rhys in a play and suggested him to Weisberg. Russell and Rhys had met briefly at a party years before, but were not fully introduced. They both were attracted to the series because of its focus on the relationship between their characters. Said Rhys, "You have two people who have led the most incredibly strange life together with incredibly high stakes, in this scene of domesticity that is an absolute lie, and at the end of the pilot they're finding each other for the very first time."

Russell described the pilot script as "interesting ... it was so far from a procedural. I didn't know that I wanted to do it. I always say no to everything. I never want to do anything. [Laughs.] But I just couldn't stop thinking about it. I read it...and I kept trying to figure it out, because it's so not clear. It's still not clear to me. But there's so many different levels to it". Rhys said of his character, "He's a sort of gift of a part in that he's very sort of layered and multi-faceted. And when you meet him, he's at this great turning point in his life where everything's changing for him. You just get to do everything. You get to do the kung fu, and you get to do the emotional scenes, you get to do the disguises. It's the full package for an actor. It's a dream." Noah Emmerich was initially hesitant about taking a role in the series. He explained: "The truth is, from the very beginning, I thought, 'I don't want to do a TV show where I carry a gun or a badge. I'm done with guns and badges. I just don't want to do that anymore'. When I first read it I thought, 'Yeah, it's really interesting and really good, but I don't want to be an FBI guy." His friend, Gavin O'Connor, who directed the pilot episode, convinced him to take a closer look at the role. Emmerich stated that he responded to the aspect of marriage and family. "It was really interesting, and it was really intelligent and unusual, and it stood out from the pack."

Episodes

Reception

Reviews
The first season of The Americans received positive reviews from critics. Based on 51 reviews collected by Rotten Tomatoes, the first season received an 88% approval rating from critics, with an average score of 7.8 out of 10. The consensus reads, "The Americans is a spy thriller of the highest order, with evocative period touches and strong chemistry between its leads." On Metacritic, the first season scored 78 out of 100 based on 35 reviews. The American Film Institute listed it as one of the top ten television series of 2013. Rob Brunner of Entertainment Weekly described it as "an absorbing spy thriller" while David Hinkley of the New York Daily News praised the pace, noting that "It's a premise that requires as much clever dramatic footwork as you might expect, and creator Joe Weisberg, a former CIA agent, handles the challenge". Verne Gay of Newsday called it a "smart newcomer with a pair of leads that turns The Americans into a likely winner" and gave it a grade of an A−. Gail Pennington, television critic for the St. Louis Post-Dispatch gave The Americans a rating of three out of four stars. In her review of the debut episode, Pennington stated "The Americans isn't just a heart-pounding action drama; by presenting heroes that are also villains, it also confronts viewers with TV's deepest moral dilemma since The Sopranos". However, Hank Stuever of The Washington Post observed that "The Americans struggles to crack a certain code; the concept is tantalizing, but the follow-through lacks the momentum that gets viewers to commit". He described it, however, as "another well-made, provocative TV drama" and suggested that it "could benefit from having the finite boundaries of being a miniseries rather than launching itself into the ambitious realm of an ongoing series."

Awards and nominations

Home media release 
The first season of The Americans was released on Blu-ray and DVD in region 1 on February 11, 2014 and in region 2 on March 3, 2014. The set includes an audio commentary for "The Colonel" by Joe Weisberg, Joel Fields and Noah Emmerich; three featurettes, "Executive Order 2579: Exposing the Americans", "Perfecting the Art of Espionage" and "Ingenuity Over Technology"; a gag reel; deleted scenes; and trailers.

References

External links
 
 

Season 1
2013 American television seasons
Television series set in 1981